National Highway 333, commonly referred to as Munger Deoghyr Highway is a national highway in India. It is a spur road of National Highway 33. NH-333 traverses the states of Bihar and Jharkhand in India.

Route 

Bihar

Munger
Bariyarpur
Kharagpur
Laxmipur 
Jamui
Chakai

Jharkhand

Deoghar.

Junctions  

  Terminal near Bariyarpur.
  near Jamui.
  Terminal near Deoghar

See also 

 List of National Highways in India by highway number
 List of National Highways in India by state

References

External links 

 NH 333 on OpenStreetMap

National highways in India
National Highways in Bihar
National Highways in Jharkhand